Coined as the "Oldest Rivalry in the South", the Capital Cup is one of the longest-running college football rivalries in the United States.  Contested yearly between the University of Richmond Spiders and College of William & Mary Tribe, only three rivalries in NCAA Division I have more games played: Lafayette–Lehigh, Princeton–Yale, and Harvard–Yale.

History
The Capital Cup is one of the oldest collegiate American football rivalries, played between the University of Richmond Spiders and College of William & Mary Tribe.  The yearly contest is the fourth most played game in college football, and through the 2019 match-up has been played 130 times. Though starting six years later than what is more commonly called the South's Oldest Rivalry between Virginia and North Carolina, this rivalry between Richmond and William & Mary was more often played twice per year in its early days instead of just once. In 1905, it was played three times. Played nearly continuously since 1898, there have only been four years that the game did not occur: 1900, 1902, 1943, and 2020.  The game had until recently been dubbed the I-64 Bowl, from 1984 though 2008.  Beginning in 2009, however, the game was officially renamed the Capital Cup, for which a new trophy was created.  The Capital Cup name was chosen to honor the entire 119-game history of the rivalry between the two schools and the status of the two cities as two of the historical capitals of the Commonwealth of Virginia.  The match-up is typically played as the final regular season game for both teams, but for many years used to be played on Thanksgiving Day.

The November 21, 2009 game marked the 119th meeting between the schools. The Richmond win placed the all-time record at 59–55–5, remaining in favor of William & Mary.  The Richmond Spiders won this inaugural Capital Cup by a final score of 13–10, simultaneously giving Richmond a share of the Colonial Athletic Association season championship.  Place kicker Andrew Howard converted a game-winning 48-yard field goal as time expired. Then, in 2010, William & Mary clinched a share of the conference with the Capital Cup win. The Tribe had to beat Richmond and have Villanova upset Delaware in order to share the championship with Delaware, and both of those results occurred.

With the Colonial Athletic Association not playing football in fall 2020 due to the COVID-19 pandemic, the Spiders and Tribe did not meet during a calendar year for the first time since 1943. Instead, the two teams were scheduled to meet twice in the spring of 2021 as part of a pared-down schedule of conference games,  although the second meeting ended up being canceled due to COVID-19 related protocols.

Trophy
The I-64 Trophy was a college football trophy that went to the winner of the annual College of William & Mary versus University of Richmond football game from 1984 through 2008.  Both Division I schools participate in the NCAA Football Championship Subdivision (formerly Division I-AA). The name for the trophy came from Interstate 64, which connects the schools through the short distance between Richmond and Williamsburg.  The I-64 Trophy was replaced in 2009 with the Capital Cup, which honors the entire history of the rivalry between the two schools and the status of the two cities as the last two capitals of the Commonwealth of Virginia.

Game results

Game MVPs
A Most Valuable Player (MVP) Award was established 2009, coinciding with the rivalry's renaming to Capital Cup.

See also  
 List of NCAA college football rivalry games
 List of most-played college football series in NCAA Division I

Notes
  During the early twentieth century, William & Mary and Richmond would occasionally play two or even three times per season since there were so few teams in the area. Thus it is not a mistake if the W-L column has identical years in them (the teams may have split the season 1–1, for example).
  Only Lafayette–Lehigh, Princeton–Yale, and Harvard–Yale have played more games.
  The 2008 game was the first in the history of the rivalry to be decided in overtime. Richmond would go on to win the 2008 NCAA Division I Football Championship by defeating the Montana Grizzlies 24–7. It was the first team national championship for Richmond in any sport.

References

College football rivalries in the United States

Richmond Spiders football
William & Mary Tribe football
American football in Virginia
Awards established in 1898
Recurring sporting events established in 1898
College sports in Virginia
Sports rivalries in Virginia